Ajay Bhupathi (born Ajay Narasimha Naga BhupathiRaju) is an Indian film director who predominantly works in Telugu cinema. He made his directorial debut film RX 100 which received positive reception. He received SIIMA Award for Best Debut Director (Telugu) in 2019. His second film was Mahasamudram starring Sharwanand & Siddharth.

Early life
Ajay Bhupathi's father, Bhupathi Ramaraju Vegesna, is a farmer in Atreyapuram, Andhra Pradesh. After his education, he moved to Hyderabad to pursue a directorial career in Telugu cinema.

Career
Bhupathi started off his career as an associate to director/screenwriter Ramesh Varma and Veeru Potla. He has worked with Ram Gopal Verma as an executive director in the film Vangaveeti, as chief co-director in the film Killing Veerappan and as associate director in films like Attack and Veera. He has worked as associate director in the films Doosukeltha with Veeru Potla. Bhupathi then made his directorial film RX 100. The film is also being remade in Hindi. His next film was Mahasamudram starring Sharwanand, Siddharth, Aditi Rao Hydari and Anu Emmanuel.

Personal life
He married his childhood sweetheart, Sirisha, on 25 August 2018, after assuring her parents in 2016, that he would make a successful debut.

Filmography

References

External links
 
 

Telugu film directors
Indian film directors
Film directors from Andhra Pradesh
Living people
1985 births
Indian male screenwriters
Artists from Andhra Pradesh
People from East Godavari district
Screenwriters from Andhra Pradesh
Indian screenwriters
21st-century Indian film directors
South Indian International Movie Awards winners